Macedonitherium is an extinct genus of giraffids. It was first named by Sickenberg in 1967.

References

External links 
 Macedonitherium at the Paleobiology Database

Prehistoric giraffes
Prehistoric even-toed ungulate genera